Dar Dehu-ye Pain (also Romanized as Dar Dehū-ye Pā’īn and Dar Dehū Pā’īn) is a village in Banestan Rural District, in the Central District of Behabad County, Yazd Province, Iran. At the 2006 census, its population was 24, in 11 families.

References 

Populated places in Behabad County